Eastbury may refer to:

Places called:
 Eastbury, Berkshire
 Eastbury, Hertfordshire
 Eastbury Manor House

Institutions called:
 Eastbury Farm JMI School